Spencer Boldman (born July 28, 1992) is an American actor. He is known for his role as Adam Davenport on Disney XD's Lab Rats, and for playing Gio in the film Cruise.

Personal life
Spencer was born in Dallas, Texas, and graduated from Plano East Senior High School in Plano, Texas in June 2010.

Career
Boldman's first major acting role was playing Adam, the eldest of the bionic teenagers, on the Disney XD series Lab Rats which premiered in 2012. The same year he had a role in the film 21 Jump Street. In 2013, he was cast in the Disney Channel Original Movie Zapped, opposite Zendaya. In 2015, Boldman was cast opposite Emily Ratajkowski in the romance film Cruise which is set during the 1980s; the film was released in 2018. In 2022, he was cast in the recurring role of Lance McCrae in the Hulu limited series Welcome to Chippendales, based on the story of Chippendales and its founder Somen Banerjee (played by Kumail Nanjiani).

Filmography

References

External links

1992 births
Plano East Senior High School alumni
Male actors from Dallas
American male child actors
American male film actors
American male television actors
Living people
21st-century American male actors